Idalus citrina is a moth of the family Erebidae. It was described by Herbert Druce in 1890. It is found in Venezuela and Brazil.

References

 

citrina
Moths described in 1890